Afolabi Adedoyin Olamilekan Oluwatimileh Obafemi (born 24 November 1994) is an English professional footballer who last played as a forward for Barking, having previously played in the Football League with  Leyton Orient and Dagenham & Redbridge.

Career

Early career
Born in Walthamstow, London, Obafemi's first football club as a youngster was Ryan F.C. During his spell at Ryan, Obafemi netted a record 48 goals in one season. During that season, he netted 48 times for the Sunday team, and 42 times whilst playing for the Saturday team. Obafemi spent a total of five years at Ryan F.C. before being scouted by Watford F.C.

Obafemi began his academy career with Watford's youth academy before switching to Leyton Orient. He was also a talented sprinter, winning the 100 metres final at the London Youth Games in 2009, in a time of 11.6 seconds.

Leyton Orient
In his first season in Orient's youth team, Obafemi was top scorer with 18 goals. In December 2011, he went on a work experience loan to Scarborough Athletic, playing in the 2–1 defeat at Barton Town Old Boys on 10 December.

On 30 March 2012 he signed for A.F.C. Sudbury, again on work experience, making his debut as a late substitute in the 1–0 win over Harlow Town on 7 April.

Obafemi made his full Orient debut on 5 May as a substitute in the 2–1 home win against Rochdale, the last game of the season.

In August 2012 Obafemi went on loan to Conference South club Bishop's Stortford, and scored in his only game in the 1–0 win over Boston United, before being recalled by the Os.

Obafemi was released by Orient on 24 April 2013.

Dagenham & Redbridge
Dagenham & Redbridge announced the free transfer signing of Obafemi on 11 July 2013. He signed a one-year deal with the club. In June 2014, after not being offered a new deal, he returned to the club for pre-season training to try and impress and earn a new contract. However, during July he was released.

Hayes & Yeading
In September 2014 he joined Hayes & Yeading United having been with Welling United, Maidstone United and Dulwich Hamlet on trial, and made his debut as a substitute in the 1–1 draw at Hemel Hempstead Town on 20 September. After making only three substitute appearances he moved to Billericay Town the following month, and stayed until the end of the season.

Obafemi signed for Welling United before the start of the 2014–15 season, and made his debut as a substitute in the 1–0 home win over Guiseley on 8 August. He scored his first goal for the club in the 2–1 home defeat by Braintree Town on 29 August.

In December 2015 he joined Bedford Town on loan, and he scored on his debut in the 2–1 defeat at home to AFC Rushden & Diamonds on 26 December.

Personal life
His younger brother Michael Obafemi is also a footballer.

Career statistics

References

1994 births
Living people
Footballers from Walthamstow
English footballers
English people of Nigerian descent
Leyton Orient F.C. players
Scarborough Athletic F.C. players
A.F.C. Sudbury players
Bishop's Stortford F.C. players
Dagenham & Redbridge F.C. players
Hayes & Yeading United F.C. players
Billericay Town F.C. players
Welling United F.C. players
Bedford Town F.C. players
Staines Town F.C. players
Wingate & Finchley F.C. players
Barking F.C. players
English Football League players
National League (English football) players
Isthmian League players
Southern Football League players
Black British sportspeople
Association football forwards